Caloptilia bimaculatella is a moth of the family Gracillariidae. It is known from Canada (Ontario and Québec) and the United States (Florida, Kentucky, Maine, Michigan, Missouri, New York, Vermont, Connecticut and West Virginia).

The wingspan is 9–10 mm.

The larvae feed on Acer rubrum. They mine the leaves of their host plant.

References

External links
Caloptilia at microleps.org
mothphotographersgroup
Bug Guide

bimaculatella
Moths of North America
Moths described in 1915